The 2005 Mosconi Cup, the 12th edition of the annual nine-ball pool competition between teams representing Europe and the United States, took place 15–18 December 2005 at the MGM Grand in Las Vegas, Nevada. A shot clock was used for the first time in the events history.

Team USA won the Mosconi Cup by defeating Team Europe 11–6.


Teams

 1 Born outside the United States.

Results

Thursday, 15 December

Friday, 16 December

Saturday, 17 December

Sunday, 18 December

References

External links
 Official homepage 

2005
2005 in cue sports
2005 in sports in Nevada
Sports competitions in Las Vegas
2005 in American sports
December 2005 sports events in the United States
MGM Grand Las Vegas